The 1947 Boston University Terriers football team was an American football team that represented Boston University as an independent during the 1947 college football season. In its first season under head coach Aldo Donelli, the team compiled a 5–3 record and outscored opponents by a total of 196 to 168.

Donelli was hired as Boston University's football coach shortly after the close of the 1946 season. He had previously been a head coach in the National Football League for the Pittsburgh Steelers and Cleveland Rams. His hiring was described by the United Press as "a giant step forward" in Boston University's "march into 'bigtime' football". Donelli remained the head coach at Boston University for 10 years.

Schedule

References

Boston University
Boston University Terriers football seasons
Boston University Terriers football